Two submarines of the Chilean Navy have borne the name Simpson and the Pennant Number SS-21.

, in service 1962–82
, launched in 1982, commissioned in 1984

Chilean Navy ship names